William Burress (19 August 1867 – 30 October 1948) was an American actor. He appeared in more than seventy films from 1915 to 1939.

Filmography

References

External links 

1867 births
1948 deaths
American male film actors